Yogi is a 2009 Indian Tamil-language action drama film directed by Subramaniam Siva, starring director-turned-actor Ameer as the titular protagonist alongside Madhumitha, and Swathi, Vincent Asokan, Ponvannan, lyricist Snehan in his acting debut, and Ganja Karuppu. An uncredited remake of the 2005 South African Academy Award-winning film Tsotsi, the film was written and produced by Ameer himself, and features musical score composed by Yuvan Shankar Raja.

The film follows Yogi, a slum-dwelling criminal who makes a living out of murders and robberies. When he is chased by cops during a robbing spree, Yogi steals a woman's car and succeeds in fleeing. His life starts to change when he realizes there is a baby inside the car, and he can't just let go of it even though he attempts to do so while abandoning the getaway car.

Launched in October 2007, Yogi was released theatrically on 27 November 2009, opening to mixed reviews. Critics praised the performances but criticized the excessive melodrama, slow pacing and similarities to Tsotsi. It became a moderate box office success. The same year, it was showcased at the 6th Dubai International Film Festival.

Plot 
Yogeshwaran aka Yogi and his gang of three men live in a slum on the edge making a living out of robberies and murders and having no human emotions. Yogi, in particular, has a dark secret about his bad past, which he keeps to himself. One day during a robbing spree, he is chased by the police. He gets into a car parked by a woman in front of a fruit shop and manages to flee, when he suddenly hears the cry of a child, finding a three-month-old baby in the car's backseat. He abandons the car and leaves the baby in there, but as he hears the baby crying, he is moved, and the human being in him wakes up. He gets back to shove the baby into a large shopping bag and takes it home with him. He hides the baby from the rest of his gang and tries to take care of the baby alone.

Yogi, then holding at gunpoint, coerces Rajasulochana, a young mother hailing from Andhra Pradesh and deserted by her husband, to breastfeed that baby. Meanwhile, it is revealed that the child's real mother, Caroline, is desperate to get her child back, whilst her husband Linden, happening to be merely the stepfather of the baby, searches with the help of rowdies for the baby, which he actually wants dead.

In the meantime, Yogi slowly gets transformed, turning into a new man thanks to the baby, which apparently prompts feelings in him, even planning to keep and bring up the child himself. A flashback reveals his past, where he had an atrocious childhood as he was terrorized by his sadistic father, a beggar who was responsible for the death of his mother and sister and for making Yogi himself a brute. However, he changes his plans and decides to reunite the baby with its mother, but unfortunately, the child slips into Linden's hands. Yogi gets to know that Linden wants to kill the baby and tries to prevent that and save the baby.

Cast

 Ameer as Yogeshwaran (Yogi)
 Madhumitha as Rajasulochana
 Swathi as Caroline Linden
 Vincent Asokan as Linden Fernando
 Snehan as Sadai
 Ganja Karuppu as "Stills" Mani
 Babu as Aspiring Actor
 Ponvannan
 Nandha Periyasamy
 Besant Ravi
 Dinakaran Reporter Devaraj as Yogi's father
 Ghazali as MLA Thiruna
 Vinodh as Inbaraj
 Jijuba as Urula (Sampath)

Production

Development
Shortly after the release of his multiple-award-winning Tamil film Paruthiveeran in February 2007, there were some speculations regarding Ameer's next project. Even before completing Paruthiveeran, it was reported that Ameer's next film will be Kutravaali, a film about a criminal, that will not feature any songs, starring Suriya in the lead role, which, however turned out to be wrong. In January 2007 then, it was reported, that Ameer will be directing a film, titled Kannabiran, again with Surya in the lead role, produced by himself. In the following months, Ameer again and again cited, that he was working on Kannabiran and he was still looking for someone to play the lead role. It was also stated, that he might direct a film with Vikram or Vijay after Kannabiran. All these reports turned out be rumors, when Ameer suddenly shelved the Kannabiran-project for unknown reasons and instead teamed up with director Subramaniam Siva to create a film, that will be written and produced by himself and directed by Subramaniam Siva, which will be titled Yogi, in which Ameer himself will act in the lead role.

The distribution rights were initially said to be brought by Kalaignar TV, who had beaten Sun Pictures, who had also plans to acquire the film's rights. However, as a sudden twist, the film's rights slipped into the hands of Sun Pictures, who were said to distribute this film. Eventually these news turned out to be fictional, with the film being released by the production house itself.

Casting
Ameer decided to take up the title role of the film himself, after no other actor was ready to enact the character of Yogeshwaran. He then was looking for an actress to take up the lead female role. Initially looking for a 13-year-old schoolgirl to play that role as per the original script, he had to drop the idea as he couldn't find any suitable actress for that role and hence changed the script. Priyamani, who played the lead female character of "Muththazhagu" in Ameer's previous venture, Paruthiveeran, that won her much accolades, fame and the National Film Award, and who, according to Ameer, was the first choice, was approached to play the role  as later was Trisha Krishnan, who debuted in Ameer's 2002 film Mounam Pesiyadhe. However, both the actresses refused the offer, before Madhumitha then accepted to play the role of the lead female character named Rajasulochana, which is said to have great scope to perform. Also actress Swathi, who acted in films like Selva and Vaanmathi with Vijay and Ajith Kumar, respectively in the 1990s was signed up to play an important role in the film. Moreover, Ameer insisted, that the actress should dub for herself in the film as well. Also lyricist Snehan was cast to play a vital role in the film as was journalist Devaraj, director Nandha Periyasamy and a real-life politician Gazzali. Apart from these, 20 newcomers are said to make their debut in the film, including two real-life slum dwellers, who would play as Ameer's friends.

Filming
Filming was held for 161 days in various areas in and around Chennai on a cost of nearly 12 crores. The shooting of the film began in mid-November 2007 and was completed by mid-July 2009. Since the story is said to revolve around a slum dweller in an urban slum, shooting was mainly held around slum areas in Chennai as in Egmore, Saidapet, Chennai Central and Teynampet. The various locations in Chennai include the Chennai City Centre and the Sathyam Theatre, for which the unit had to get permissions first, which was said to be very costly and one main reason for the delay of the shooting. Several fight scenes in the climax were shot at the terrace of Big Bazaar in Vadapalani, at Ennore and a house in Besant Nagar. In August 2009, however, it was reported, that "last leg shooting" was being held in Thiruvottiyur in Chennai at the famous Vadivudaiyamman Temple. In April 2008, reports claimed, that Ameer was injured during the shooting, which was going on at the AVM Studios, when he was jumping from 40 meter high and sustained fracture in his right hand.

Music

The musical score of Yogi is composed by Ameer's friend, Yuvan Shankar Raja, teaming up with Ameer again for this picture, having earlier worked on several projects as Mounam Pesiyadhe (2002), Raam (2005), and Paruthiveeran (2007), which all turned out to be huge musical hits. The score and most of the songs are centred on the traditional Indian string instrument sarangi, an essential part of Hindustani classical music, which is considered the hardest to Indian instrument to master. Noted Sarangi player Ustad Sultan Khan was therefore assigned to perform the sarangi pieces in this film.

The soundtrack was released on 13 September 2009 at Sathyam Cinemas among many prominent personalities. Yuvan Shankar Raja and Ameer had travelled to France in September 2007 to compose and record the songs, which were released only two years later. The album consists of six tracks and features the voices of Ameer himself, composer Yuvan Shankar Raja, lyricist Snehan, rapper Blaaze, Neha Bhasin and noted Sarangi player Ustad Sultan Khan, who has performed the Sarangi in this album as well, among others. Both versions of "Yogi Yogi Thaan" weren't featured in the film. The lyrics were written by Snehan, who usually pens for Ameer's films.

The soundtrack received generally positive reviews. Karthik of Bangalore Mirror described it as "brilliant", while a critic from Indiaglitz.com wrote it was "stylish" and "scintillating". Rediff'''s Pavithra Srinivasan gave a mixed review, citing that Yuvan Shankar Raja "partially delivers in Yogi". However, despite garnering favorable reviews, the songs failed to become prominent, due to the film's poor theatrical run.

Reception

Pavithra Srinivasan from Rediff.com gave the film 3 stars out 5 and praised the secondary actors, dialogues, twists, music and art direction. Criticism was aimed towards the performance of Ameer, slow pacing and the film's similarities with Tsotsi. Bhama Devi Ravi from The Times of India gave the film 2.5 stars out of 5, noting it had plenty of fight scenes unlike the original, and praised the film's rawness along with the performances. However, the reviewer felt the film reminded too much of Tsotsi, and also criticized the melodramatic episodes and lack of depth in characterization. Behindwoods similarly gave it 2.5 stars out of 5, praising the performances and depiction of the darker side of human life. The reviewer criticized the dosage of melodrama and the placement of some fight scenes. S. Viswanath from Deccan Herald praised the performances of Ameer and Madhumitha, but similarly criticized the film's similarities with Tsotsi and execution. A reviewer from Sify.com praised the performances and cinematography, while criticizing the music, loopholes in writing and excessive melodrama in the second half, along with the execution and predictability of the climax. Malathi Rangarajan from The Hindu'' praised the performances of Devaraj and Madhumitha, Ganja Karuppu's situational humor, editing and music. However, she felt Ameer was expressionless and the pace was too slow for an action film.

References

External links
 

2009 films
Films scored by Yuvan Shankar Raja
2000s Tamil-language films
2009 action drama films
Indian action drama films
Indian remakes of foreign films
Films directed by Subramaniam Siva